Dagmar Searchinger Wilson (January 25, 1916 – January 6, 2011) was an American anti-nuclear testing activist, artist, and illustrator of children's books for Whitman's Children's Books.

Born in Manhattan, New York City, her parents were Cesar and Marion Searchinger. Wilson founded Women Strike for Peace in 1961 to end the testing of nuclear weapons.

Early Motivations/ Accomplishments 
 When the US-Soviet Arms race began, Dagmar Wilson, a concerned mother of 3, learned about the implications of nuclear war. 
 She started a telephone tree, urging her friends to call their friends to marshal support for her one day demonstration in support of peace and disarmament.  
 On November 1, 1961 a loose network of 50,000 mothers, grandmothers, and other women demonstrated in 60 cities across the country. 
 Calling on president John F. Kennedy to "end the arms-race - not the human race," Wilson and her colleagues won wide attention from world leaders and press. Kennedy gave partial credit to Wilson and her fellows to force the Cold War super powers to eventually sign a nuclear-test ban treaty.

Notes

People from Manhattan
American anti–nuclear weapons activists
American pacifists
1916 births
2011 deaths
Activists from New York (state)